Sam Crump was a member of the Arizona State Senate from 2007 through 2010. He was elected to the State House in November 2006, and won re-election in 2008. He resigned in January 2010, in order to run for the U.S. House of Representatives, for the seat being vacated by John Shadegg.

References

Republican Party members of the Arizona House of Representatives
Living people
Year of birth missing (living people)